The Laramie Downtown Historic District comprises the historic core of Laramie, Wyoming. Established in 1868, Laramie owes its existence to the Union Pacific Railway, which chose the site and began selling property. By 1871 Laramie was the county seat of Albany County. The historic district includes many buildings dating to the earliest days of Laramie as well as railroad-related structures built between 1870 and 1938. 59 buildings are considered to be contributing structures in the 10-1/2 square block area.

Downtown Laramie was placed on the National Register of Historic Places on November 10, 1988.

References

External links

 Laramie Downtown Historic District at the Wyoming State Historic Preservation Office

National Register of Historic Places in Albany County, Wyoming
Victorian architecture in Wyoming
Late 19th and Early 20th Century American Movements architecture
Historic districts on the National Register of Historic Places in Wyoming